Intimate Confessions Of A Chinese Courtesan is a 1972 Hong Kong film directed by Chor Yuen and starring Lily Ho.

Plot
As a Shaw Brothers classics, sweet young Ai Nu is abducted and sold to the popular Four Seasons brothel run by lusty madam Chun Yi. AiNu's fiery attitude gets her locked away in a dungeon. In one scene, after whipping a defiant AiNu, lesbian Madam Chun proceeds to lick the open wounds on the girl's back. Chun Yi falls for Ai Nu nubile charge and entrusts her with a number of martial arts secrets like "Ghost Hands," which allows a fighter to plunge into an opponent's chest. Soon murder erupts within the brothel, and a policeman must race against time to prevent a vicious revenge plot from reaching its blood-spattered conclusion.

Cast 
 Lily Ho as Ai Nu 
 Betty Pei Ti as  Chun Yi
 Yueh Hua as Chi Te
 Kong Ling - Prostitute
 Chan Lap-Ban - Lao Yao Gui (hooker trainer)
 Hung Ling-Ling - Prostitute
 Chan Mei-Hua - Ainu's maid
 Yuan Man-Tzu - Ainu's maid
 Michelle Yim - Ainu's maid

Release
The film was distributed theatrically in Hong Kong on 9 July 1972. The film grossed a total of $1,108,437 Hong Kong dollars domestically. The film was a box office hit in Hong Kong. The film was remade by Shaw Brothers Studios in 1984 as Lust for Love of a Chinese Courtesan.

Reception
From a contemporary reviews, Tony Rayns reviewed an 83-minute dubbed language version of the film in the Monthly Film Bulletin. Rayns noted the editing done on the film which removed "all its sex and some of its violence by the British censor, its programme-filler origins are still amply evident in its routine caricatures, the all too regular climaxes, the fatuous dubbed dialogue and the patchwork music track."  Rayns concluded that the result was like an "extended gloss on the moment in Scarlet Empress when Dietrich both trumps and dismisses weaponry with a twist of her veil. Intimate Confessions lacks he compression and resonance of Sternberg, but it is none the less a genuine Z-movie equivalent."

References

External links 

Intimate Confessions Of A Chinese Courtesan at Hong Kong Cinemagic
 
 
 Intimate Confessions of a Chinese Courtesan at filmaffinity.com

1972 films
Shaw Brothers Studio films
Hong Kong erotic films
Lesbian-related films
Works about sex trafficking
1970s Hong Kong films